Margaret Ann "Maggie" Estep (March 20, 1963 – February 12, 2014) was an American writer and poet, best known for coming to prominence during the height of the spoken word and poetry slam performance rage. She published seven books and released two spoken word albums: No More Mr. Nice Girl and Love is a Dog From Hell.

Biography
Margaret Ann Estep was born in 1963 in Summit, New Jersey. As a poet, she emerged in the early 1990s when grunge was the height of fashion and her "direct, aggressive and uncompromisingly modern" poetry was highly accessible.

Estep appeared on Lollapalooza's third stage in 1994, and featured on MTV's Spoken Word Unplugged, PBS's The United States of Poetry, and most recently on Season 3 of HBO's Def Poetry. Her video for her spoken word track "Hey Baby" received moderate rotation on MTV and was highlighted on MTV's Beavis & Butt-head. She also contributed vocals to two songs on Recoil's 1997 album Unsound Methods. In 2003 she wrote sleevenotes for the Talking Heads box set Once in a Lifetime.

Estep went on to write many novels, including Diary of an Emotional Idiot, the Ruby Murphy mystery trilogy, Gargantuan, Hex and Flamethrower, and Alice Fantastic.  Hex was named New York Times Notable Book for 2003. She had, for several years, been at work on The Angelmakers, a novel about 19th Century female gangsters and the founding of animal rights.

Death
Estep suffered a heart attack on February 10, 2014, at her home in Hudson, New York, and died from complications two days later in an Albany hospital, aged 50. She was survived by her mother and three half-siblings.

Discography
Studio albums
 No More Mr. Nice Girl  (1994, NuYo/Imago)
 Love is a Dog From Hell  (1997, Mouth Almighty Records/Mercury)

Compilation appearances
 Skid Row Wine, on compilation Kicks, Joy, Darkness: A Tribute to Jack Kerouac   (1997)

Music videos
 "Hey Baby" (1994)
 "Vicious" (1997, dir. Steve Buscemi)

Bibliography
 Diary of an Emotional Idiot: A Novel, Harmony, 1997, ; Counterpoint LLC, 2003, 
 Soft Maniacs: Stories, Simon & Schuster, 1999, 
 ; Crown Publishing Group, 10 March 2010, 978-0-307-53082-0
 Love Dance of the Mechanical Animals: Confessions, Highly Subjective Journalism, Old Rants and New Stories, Three Rivers Press, 2003, 
 ; Crown Publishing Group, 24 March 2010, 
 ; Crown Publishing Group, 31 March 2010, 
 ; Akashic Books, 2013, 978-1-61775-005-2

References

External links

"Lollapalooza Tour Diaries," a memoir in Sensitive Skin magazine

1963 births
2014 deaths
American women novelists
American women singers
Singers from New Jersey
American women poets
Writers from Summit, New Jersey
American spoken word poets
Alternative rock singers
Women mystery writers
20th-century American poets
20th-century American novelists
20th-century American women writers
Musicians from Summit, New Jersey
Novelists from New Jersey
21st-century American women